Histatin-1 is a protein that in humans is encoded by the HTN1 gene.

References

Further reading

Antimicrobial peptides